BPDA or biphenyl-tetracarboxylic acid dianhydride is a monomer used in the production of some polyimides.

Applications
Tape automated bonding (TAB), chip on film (COF), lead lock tape, high density flexible printed circuit (FPC), stiffener for FPC, office automation equipment, flexible solar cells, speaker diaphragms (for mobile phones, plasma televisions and car audio, etc.), heavy electric machinery, office automation equipment, thermal control film for satellites, printed circuit boards, metallic substrates, sheet heating elements, heat resistance wires.

Characteristics
 Physical, mechanical, electrical, and chemical properties under high-temperature conditions.
 High tensile strength and modulus, and also features outstanding long-term heat resistance.

Analytics
The chemical shifts in 1H and 13C NMR spectroscopy are given in the literature. The melting point is 299 - 301 °C.

See also
 Polyamide
 UPILEX

References

Monomers
Biphenyls
Carboxylic anhydrides